The New Zealand women's cricket team toured England to play the England women's cricket team in September 2021. The tour consisted of three Women's Twenty20 International (WT20I) and five Women's One Day International (WODI) matches.

England won the first WT20I match by 46 runs, with New Zealand winning the second match by four wickets to level the series. England won the third WT20I match by four wickets to win the series 2–1. England won the first two WODI matches by 30 runs and 13 runs respectively to take a 2–0 lead in the series. On the day before the third WODI, a member of the New Zealand team management received a bomb threat, but the threat was deemed "not credible". The match went ahead as scheduled, with New Zealand winning by three wickets. England won the fourth WODI by three wickets to win the series with a match to spare. England won the fifth WODI by 203 runs to win the series 4–1.

Squads

New Zealand did not name individual squads for the WODI and WT20I matches, opting instead to name a combined squad of sixteen players for the tour. In August 2021, Rosemary Mair was ruled out of New Zealand's squad due to an injury. Molly Penfold was added to the squad as Mair's replacement.

Maia Bouchier and Charlie Dean earned their maiden call-ups to the England team for the WT20I matches. However, both players were ruled out of the first match after being identified as possible COVID-19 contacts, with Emma Lamb being added to England's squad. Anya Shrubsole was ruled out of England's squad for the first two WODI matches due to an ankle injury. Maia Bouchier was added to the WODI squad ahead of the third match of the series, but was released before the fifth match to enable her to play in the 2021 Rachael Heyhoe Flint Trophy final.

Tour match
Ahead of the tour, New Zealand played a warm-up match against the England A team, with England A winning by four wickets.

WT20I series

1st WT20I

2nd WT20I

3rd WT20I

WODI series

1st WODI

2nd WODI

3rd WODI

4th WODI

5th WODI

Notes

References

External links
 Series home at ESPN Cricinfo

Women's cricket tours of England
2021 in New Zealand cricket
2021 in English cricket
International cricket competitions in 2021
England 2021
cricket
2021 in women's cricket